Kent Mans Wiedemann served as U.S. Ambassador to the Kingdom of Cambodia from 1999 to 2002, Chargé d'Affaires ad interim to Burma from 1996 to 1999, and as Deputy Assistant Secretary of State for East Asian and Pacific Affairs, 1998 to 1999.  He was director of the office of Chinese Affairs at the Department of State between 1989 and 1991.  Other diplomatic postings with the US Department of State were in Poland, China, Singapore and Israel.  Wiedemann was a Peace Corps Volunteer in Micronesia from 1967 to 1969.

Wiedemann received his undergraduate degree from San Jose State University in 1967 and an M.A from the University of Oregon in 1973.

External links
 https://web.archive.org/web/20080314214120/http://www.state.gov/r/pa/ho/po/com/10404.htm

Year of birth missing (living people)
University of Oregon alumni
Ambassadors of the United States to Myanmar
Ambassadors of the United States to Cambodia
Living people
San Jose State University alumni